Luoyangdong (Luoyang East) railway station is a railway station in Luoyang, Henan.

History
Services at Luoyang East were suspended on 1 July 2020.

See also
 Luoyang railway station
 Luoyang Longmen railway station

References

Railway stations in Henan
Stations on the Longhai Railway
Railway stations in China opened in 1909